David A. Cullen (born February 1, 1960) is an American lawyer who is serving as the current Treasurer of Milwaukee County, Wisconsin. Prior to his election, Cullen served as a Democratic member of the Wisconsin State Assembly after winning a special election in May 1990. Cullen was elected in April 2012 to a seat on the Milwaukee County Board of Supervisors, which he held until taking office as County Treasurer.

Early life and education 
Cullen was born on February 1, 1960, in Milwaukee, Wisconsin. He graduated from John Marshall High, received his Bachelor of Science degree in secondary education from the University of Wisconsin–Madison in 1981, and his J.D. degree from Marquette University in 1984. He is a member of the Wisconsin Bar Association and practiced law for six years prior to being elected to the Wisconsin State Assembly.

Political career 
In 1983, he was elected to the Milwaukee School Board and served continuously until 1990. He was president of the School Board from 1987 until 1990. On May 1, 1990, he was elected to the Wisconsin State Assembly in a special election (to fill the vacancy created by the election of Tom Barrett to the State Senate), with 2,347 votes to 1,661 for Republican Steven Woehrer; and was re-elected in the subsequent biennial elections through 2010. In 2012, he served on the Assembly standing committees on consumer protection and personal privacy and on insurance; on the joint audit committee, and on the state Commission on Uniform State Laws.

In 2012, after redistricting by the Republican-controlled legislature pushed his district into heavily Republican territory in Waukesha County, he chose to run for an open seat on the Milwaukee County Board.<ref>Sandler, Larry. "Rep. Cullen seeks Milwaukee County Board seat", All Politics Blog Milwaukee Journal Sentinel December 6, 2011</ref> He won his race with 58% of the vote.

In August 2014, he defeated former State Treasurer Dawn Marie Sass for the Democratic nomination for Milwaukee County Treasurer, with 38,492 votes (53%) to Sass' 33,729 (47%). There was no candidate in any other party's primary in that race.

 Personal life 
Cullen and his wife have two children, Katie and Eddie.

 References 

External links

 Follow the Money - David Cullen
2008 2006 2004 2002 2000 1998 campaign contributions
Campaign 2008 campaign contributions at Wisconsin Democracy Campaign''

County supervisors in Wisconsin
School board members in Wisconsin
Democratic Party members of the Wisconsin State Assembly
1960 births
Living people
Politicians from Milwaukee
University of Wisconsin–Madison School of Education alumni
Marquette University Law School alumni
Wisconsin lawyers
21st-century American politicians